Natasha Hovey (born August 14, 1967) is a Lebanese-Italian-French  former film and television actress and a radio-hostess.

Hovey was born in Beirut, Lebanon, the daughter of an American musician father and a Dutch graphologist mother.  She moved to Rome at 7, and at 16 debuted as actress with a leading role in Carlo Verdone's Acqua e sapone. 

Her typical role was the young, pretty high-class girl. She also appeared in commercials, television programs and stage works. 
 
In the late 1990s she moved to Paris and retired from the entertainment industry.

Selected filmography 
 Acqua e sapone (1983)
 Summer Games (1984)
 Demons (1985)
 Compagni di scuola (1988)
 Volevo i pantaloni (1990)
 La piovra,  (1995)

References

External links 
 

Italian film actresses
Italian television actresses
20th-century Italian actresses
Lebanese emigrants to Italy
Actresses from Rome
Living people
1967 births